Bridge to the Sun is a 1961 film directed by Etienne Périer and starring Carroll Baker, James Shigeta, James Yagi, Tetsurō Tamba and Sean Garrison. It is based on the 1957 autobiography Bridge to the Sun by Gwen Terasaki, which detailed events in Terasaki's life and marriage.

Plot

Gwen Harold, an American woman from Tennessee, meets Hidenari Terasaki (called Terry by his friends and family), the secretary to the Japanese ambassador, while attending a reception at the Japanese embassy in Washington D.C. with her Aunt Peggy and friend Bill. They share a moment while Terry is showing her the antique Japanese artworks on display in the embassy, and after some reluctance, she agrees to allow him to call on her.

They begin dating and they quickly fall in love, even though Terry occasionally has fits of anti-Western sentiment. When Terry asks her to marry him, she agrees, much to the chagrin of Aunt Peggy (who was raised in the Jim Crow South), and who sees the relationship as unnatural, especially when there are "nice clean young men" available. The Japanese ambassador also calls on Gwen and attempts to dissuade her from accepting, claiming that it would hurt Terry's career by giving him an American bias, and states that even though the two countries are friendly, anything could happen between foreign countries. He seems to hint at possible aggression in the future, even though it is only 1935 and the Japanese have not yet resumed conflicts with China, keeping the countries of Gwen and Terry at an uneasy peace. They eventually marry despite the obstacles and, when Terry is recalled, travel to Japan by ship.

Almost immediately after disembarking and arriving in Tokyo, Terry begins to treat Gwen much differently, expecting her to behave according to the male-centric beliefs of contemporary Japan, such as being silent among men, entering doors after the men and virtually bending to every whim of Terry and her male relatives. They continually fight and make up, mostly because of Gwen's outspokenness among men and Terry's strict adherence to the local customs.

After having a fight one night when a general says that Terry should be proud that he may have a son to die for the emperor, they make up and she reveals that she was so offended by the comment because she is pregnant. The baby daughter is named Mako.

By November 1941, Terry has been reassigned to the embassy in America. They have Thanksgiving dinner in Washington with Aunt Peggy, as World War II embroils the world around them and the U.S. is one of the few powers of the world still at peace. Terry speaks on the phone with his friend Haro. He mentions that Mako, now about five years old, has an apparent illness involving too many antibodies in her blood. He also mentions a possible upcoming invasion of Thailand by the Imperial Japanese Army.

Sensing that it may be the last chance for peace between the U.S. and the Empire of Japan, Terry attempts to go over the heads of his superiors and have a cable sent directly to President Roosevelt, alerting him to cable the Japanese emperor to seek to preserve the peace. However, the emperor is rapidly becoming the leader of Japan in name only because of a power struggle with the army leaders. Terry's effort is in vain, as December 7th comes and war is declared shortly after the Japanese attack.

Terry calls Gwen after hearing of the attack and tells her to leave Washington for Tennessee with Mako, but the FBI enter and force her to hang up the phone. She decides to accompany Terry back to Japan, as he is due to be deported in an ambassador exchange. A riot nearly occurs as she leaves with the other Japanese families, because of anti-Japanese fervor sweeping the nation in the aftermath of the attack on Pearl Harbor, the Philippines and other European and American-held colonies and bases in the Pacific and Asia.

In Japan, a similar nationalist anti-American hatred is present among the citizens. Terry is less enthusiastic about the war, and attempts to be a mediator for peace, which is dangerous because of the prevailing sentiment and the secret police. Gwen is briefly accosted by a group of soldiers, who try to force her to walk on an American flag. She refuses, and an air raid begins, causing panic in the streets as bombs begin to destroy the area. She sees a crying child and, remembering her daughter, runs to the smoldering school to rescue Mako, who says that children had hit her and called her an American.

Later, Terry reveals that he is under suspicion for being disloyal because he has an American wife, does not belong to any patriotic clubs, and speaks out against the war. Soldiers enter and search the house, and while they don't arrest him, it is clear that he and his family are going to have a rough time as long as they stay in Tokyo. They agree to stay at a friend's empty house outside of the city.

As they leave Tokyo, they run into Terry's cousin, Ishi, who has been one of the few people who has been kind to Gwen. Now a soldier, he informs them that he is captain in a kamikaze squadron, and will soon "die for a descendent of the sun-god." While taking a train, Gwen sees captured American soldiers, possibly on a death march. They arrive at their new home and meet the young girl who lives there. Terry reveals that he is going back to Tokyo, and that he did not tell her earlier because she would not have gone to stay without him. He offers to arrange her passage back to the U.S., but she refuses, wanting to be close to her husband.

As the war continues, food shortages and widespread damage make it clear that things are going against Japan. As the years go on, Terry visits less and less, and Mako grows up not knowing any other existence other than one of perpetual war. Terry returns after months and they enjoy a night's sleep together. They awaken to a visit from a military police officer, who is looking for Terry. As the war continues to turn against them, they begin to suspect disloyalty from anyone critical of the government. Gwen manages to convince them that she has not seen Terry, and they leave. Terry reveals that he has brought a radio, and an American news station announces the end of the Battle of Iwo Jima, which will be used as a base to launch bombers against mainland Japan. Later on, the surrender of Nazi Germany, Japan's main ally, is also announced, and it is clear that the invasion of Japan is coming soon.

Terry and Gwen have a fight one night because he gave away the last of their food. Gwen goes to the village to get her hair done to please her husband, and on her way home, she allows Mako to play in the village, but then a squadron of American bombers and fighters attack. The couple rush to find her, and amid the devastation of the village, they find Mako, alive and unhurt. However, her close friend has been hit and was killed instantly. At the burial, Gwen comments on Mako's jaded reaction, showing no tears or emotion for her friend, because of Japanese customs, as well as growing up during a war.

One night, Gwen visits Terry's old friend Hara, who has some power within the party, pleading for him to keep her husband safe. He introduces her to Tokyo Rose, a radio propaganda announcer who tries to lower the morale of enemy armies listening to her broadcasts. They agree to help Terry, but only if Gwen makes an anti-American speech on the radio, recognizing the propaganda value of an actual American denouncing her country. Gwen refuses, and learns that Ishi has been fatally injured and is in the hospital. She visits, and realizing that he is dying, she asks why he had sent his wife away. He reveals that it is because of tradition that he did not want his loved ones to see him die. She returns home in time to see Terry, who had been hiding in the hills to avoid arrest, return.

The next day, the entire village arrives at their house, as it is the only one with a radio, for the emperor's radio address. The emperor has never spoken in public before, so they realize he must have major news, possibly of a surrender. As the village listens to the emperor's voice for the first time, the speech starts:

With the war over, Terry asks Gwen to return to her home of Johnson City, Tennessee to put Mako in an American school while she is young and can lose her prejudices against America, to "become a bridge between the two nations." Gwen vehemently refuses to leave him. Later on, she finds Terry, who has been overworked, malnourished and ill for many months, standing over his parents' graves. She recalls a speech that he once gave her about visiting the graves of ancestors at times of marriage, birth, and death. She also recalls the conversation with Ishi at the hospital before his death when he said that he did not want his wife to see him die. She speaks to Terry's doctor and learns that he has, at most, months to live, and was trying to send his family away because, like his cousin, he didn't want them to see him die.

Days later, after Gwen agrees to Terry's final wish for her and Mako to depart for America, he sees her and their daughter off at the dock. They kiss and embrace for the last time, and Gwen reassures Terry that they will be expecting him soon, knowing that she will never see him again.

As the ship departs, Terry walks down the dock, keeping pace with it until he can go no further. The film ends with Gwen and Terry lovingly meeting each other's gaze for the final time. Gwen holds her composure until he is out of sight, and then breaks down and begins crying.

Cast
 Carroll Baker as Gwen Terasaki
 James Shigeta as Hidenari Terasaki
 James Yagi as Hara
 Tetsurō Tamba as Jiro
 Sean Garrison as Fred Tyson
 Ruth Masters as Aunt Peggy
 Nori Elisabeth as Hermann
 Emi Florence Hirsch as Mako Terasaki, at different ages
 Hiroshi Tomono as Ishi

Historical accuracy
The memoir narrates the life of Gwen Harold (1906–1990), an American from Tennessee who in 1931 married Hidenari "Terry" Terasaki (b.1900), a Japanese diplomat. He was first secretary at the Japanese embassy in Washington, D.C. in 1941 when Pearl Harbor was bombed, was one of the staff who helped translate the Japanese declaration of war and delivered it (late) to the U.S. government and (as Gwen Terasaki wrote in her memoirs) earlier sent secret messages to Japanese pacifists seeking to avert war. The couple and their daughter Mariko were, like all Axis diplomats, interned in 1942 and repatriated via neutral Angola later that year. Terasaki held various posts in the Japanese foreign affairs department up to 1945 when he became an advisor to the emperor, and was the official liaison between the imperial palace and General Douglas MacArthur, the Supreme Allied Commander.

Mariko and her mother left Japan in 1949 so that Mariko could attend East Tennessee State University in Johnson City, Tennessee. Terry died in 1951 in Japan at the age of 50.

During the scene in which the Japanese ambassador tries to persuade Gwen to call off the marriage, he seems to hint at a possible conflict between the two countries.  However, it is unlikely that he would have been aware of any definitive war aims in 1935, as Japan was still at peace with China. Soon after, Japan would declare war and, in protest against its actions, the United States would issue an oil embargo against Japan, escalating the disagreement between the two and paving the way for war.

The speech that Hirohito gives on the radio at the end of the film is a part of the actual recording of the speech that was played to announce plans of surrender. However, Terry's translation for Gwen is actually only bits and pieces of the much longer speech, but it sounds as though he is translating it word for word.

References

External links
 
 
 Bridge to the Sun at TCMDB
 
 article on Mariko Terasaki Miller
 article on Mariko Terasaki Miller as 1998 Outstanding Alumna for East Tennessee State University
 Website of the book
 Review of film by Bosley Crowther at The New York Times (October 18, 1961)

1961 films
1961 romantic drama films
American romantic drama films
Asian-American romance films
1960s biographical drama films
1960s English-language films
French romantic drama films
Metro-Goldwyn-Mayer films
Films about interracial romance
Films based on non-fiction books
Films directed by Étienne Périer
Films set in Tokyo
Films set in the United States
Films set in the 1930s
Films set in the 1940s
Films scored by Georges Auric
English-language French films
Japan in non-Japanese culture
1960s American films
1960s French films